Itzhak Brook (born 1941) is an adjunct professor of pediatrics and medicine at Georgetown University School of Medicine, Washington DC. He specializes in infectious diseases. He is a past chairman of the Anti-infective Drug Advisory Committee of the Food and Drug Administration (FDA) and chaired the Committee when AZT was approved for the treatment of HIV/AIDS in 1987.

Medical research & work 
Brook has developed treatment guidelines for primary care clinicians, and has also done work on infectious disease of broad public interest. His main research interests are anaerobic infections, sinusitis, and tonsillitis. He is a long-standing campaigner against overuse of antibiotics which can lead to antibiotic resistance, has researched common health threats like disease transmission on airplanes, while dispelling common concerns about contaminated library books and subway handlebars.  He has also been an expert source for major media on health issues like AZT, improving patient care after serious illness and cancer, and preventing medical errors.

Brook has authored publications in scientific journals and 10 medical textbooks. He is the author of "The Laryngectomee Guide" that was published in 22 languages.

He is the US editor of Journal of Pediatric Infectious Diseases, Editor Textbook of "Pediatrics Infectious Diseases " at Medscape Reference, Section Editor of "Pediatric Infections" at Current Infectious Diseases Report, associate editor of Journal of Medical Case Reports, a member of the editorial board of several medical journals, and a board member of the Head and Neck Cancer Alliance.

He served in the United States Navy from 1980 to 2006. He researched the treatment of bacterial infections after ionized radiation for which he was awarded three Defense Meritorious Service Medals. Brook received the 2012 J. Conley Medical Ethics Award of the American Academy of Otolaryngology–Head and Neck Surgery.

Brook is a fellow of the Infectious Diseases Society of America, the Society for Pediatric Research, and the Pediatric Infectious Diseases Society. His research interests include anaerobic infections, the pathogenesis and therapy of polymicrobial infections, including upper respiratory tract infections (i.e. sinusitis, tonsillitis).

Personal 

Brook wrote a book about his experience as a patient with throat cancer  and a book about his experiences as a battalion physician in the 1973 Yom Kippur War.

His daughter is Tammy Brook, founder and CEO of FYI Brand Group.

References

External links 
 Brook's page on head and neck cancer and laryngectomy 
 Brook's page on anaerobic infections
 Brook's page on sinusitis
 Brook's page on tonsillitis

1941 births
Living people
Georgetown University Medical Center faculty
Fellows of the Infectious Diseases Society of America